Capsize is an American hardcore punk band from San Diego, California.

History
Capsize released their first full-length album, Set Sail, in 2010. In 2014, Capsize released their second full-length album, and first via Equal Vision Records, titled The Angst In My Veins. In 2016, Capsize released their third full-length album titled A Reintroduction: The Essence of All That Surrounds Me.

In 2019, Daniel Wand and Nick Lopez of Capsize were accused of sexual misconduct allegations, including sexually propositioning underage girls. This caused the band to cancel their European tour and drop off their upcoming tour with Blessthefall. Following the allegations against Wand and Lopez, the band deleted both their Facebook and Twitter accounts and subsequently broke up.

On September 16, 2022, Capsize released their first song in 4 years, "Fading Face".

References

Hardcore punk groups from California
Musical groups from San Diego
Equal Vision Records artists